Juan Carlos Jobet Eluchans is a Chilean politician and former member of Renovación Nacional. He was the Minister of Mining of Chile between 2020 and 2022.

Early life and career
Jobet is the son of Juan Carlos Jobet Sotomayor and the journalist Celia Eluchans. He is also a nephew of Edmundo Eluchans Urenda. 

Jobet studied commercial engineering at the Pontificia Universidad Católica de Chile. He has a master's degree in Business Administration and Public Administration from Harvard University. 

Between 2000 and 2010 Jobet worked at the company Asset.

Political career
Between 2013 and 2014, Jobet served as Minister of Labor and Social Security during President Sebastián Piñera's first government. On 13 June 2019, he was appointed Minister of Energy during Piñera's second government.

Jobet entered politics with his incorporation into the organization Independientes en Red, created by Cristina Bitar. Later, he was founder, along with Felipe Kast, of a think tank called Horizontal. Then, in 2010 he joined to political party Renovación Nacional. At Sebastián Piñera's first government beginning, he assumed as Chief of Staff of then Minister of the Interior Rodrigo Hinzpeter. On 29 July 2011, he was appointed Undersecretary of Housing. He worked there until 12 November 2012. On 24 July 2013, he assumed as Minister of Labor and Social Security of Chile following Evelyn Matthei (UDI) resignation. He remained in the charge until the end of Piñera's government. 

On 13 June 2019, Jobet was appointed Minister of Energy during Piñera's second government. He replaced Susana Jiménez.

On 18 December 2020, he became the Minister of Mining under Sebastián Piñera.

Other activities
 P4G – Partnering for Green Growth and the Global Goals 2030, Member of the Board of Directors (since 2020)

Personal life
In 2004 Jobet married the historian Luz María Díaz de Valdés Herrera, daughter of the lawyer and former Club Deportivo Universidad Católica's president Manuel Díaz de Valdés. He had two daughters with her.

References

1975 births
Living people
Chilean Ministers of Mining
Harvard University alumni
National Renewal (Chile) politicians
Politicians from Santiago
Pontifical Catholic University of Chile alumni
Ministers of Energy of Chile